is a Japanese figure skating coach and former competitor.

She is the mother and coach of Nobunari Oda who both are direct descendants of Oda Nobunaga.

External links
Japan Figure Skating Instructor Association
2007 Universiade Japan team

1947 births
Japanese female single skaters
Japanese figure skating coaches
Living people
Female sports coaches
Academic staff of Kansai University